"Praise to the Lord, the Almighty" is a Christian hymn based on Joachim Neander's German-language hymn "Lobe den Herren, den mächtigen König der Ehren", published in 1680. John Julian in his A Dictionary of Hymnology calls the German original "a magnificent hymn of praise to God, perhaps the finest creation of its author, and of the first rank in its class."

The melody used by Neander, first published in 1665, exists in many versions and is probably based on a folk tune. It is catalogued as Zahn number 1912c with several variants. The text paraphrases Psalm 103 and Psalm 150. Catherine Winkworth published her English translation of Neander's hymn in 1863.

History 
The common name given to this melody is "Lobe den Herren". Several variants were published with various secular texts between 1665 and 1680, when Joachim Neander published his German hymn "Lobe den Herren, den mächtigen König der Ehren", using its meter.

It was the favorite hymn of King Frederick William III of Prussia, who first heard it in 1800.

Text
Julian's A Dictionary of Hymnology lists more than ten English translations of "Lobe den Herren" printed in various 19th-century hymnals. The one most commonly appearing in modern hymnals is by Catherine Winkworth, with various editorial alterations.

Hymnologist Lionel Adey uses Winkworth's translation as an example of translators' reshaping a text to their own era's tastes, noting that she discards the German Renaissance flavor of psaltery and harp to introduce a mention of "health" more typical of 19th-century Christianity. Although he praises other translations by Winkworth, and describes this one as a 20th-century "classic", he critiques her changes to the sense of Neander's text as an example of "muscular Christianity tinged with Philistinism".

Melody

Musical settings
Johann Sebastian Bach used the chorale as the base for his chorale cantata Lobe den Herren, den mächtigen König der Ehren, BWV 137, in 1725. Although only the text of the outer stanzas was kept completely, he referred to the unusual melody in bar form with a Stollen of five measures and a climax at the beginning of the Abgesang in all movements but one. Conductor John Eliot Gardiner assumes, looking at the festive instrumentation and the general content of praise and thanksgiving, that the cantata was also performed that year to celebrate Ratswahl, the inauguration of the Leipzig city council. In 1729 Bach concluded his wedding cantata Herr Gott, Beherrscher aller Dinge, BWV 120a, with the final movement of the chorale cantata, transposed to D major. Bach transcribed the second movement of cantata 137 as the last of his Schübler Chorales for solo organ, BWV 650.

Several other notable composers used the tune in chorale preludes for organ, including Johann Gottfried Walther and Johann Kirnberger. Max Reger also wrote preludes on the tune, as No. 24 of his 52 chorale preludes, Op. 67, in 1902, and as part of his collection Op. 135a. He also used the tune in Sieben Stücke, Op. 145. Johann Nepomuk David composed a toccata on the melody.

The German choral composer Hugo Distler produced a popular arrangement of the hymn for a cappella chorus, as part of his Drei kleine Choralmotetten.

Notes

References

External links 
 
 , sung by the choir of St Andrew's Cathedral, Sydney

English Christian hymns
1680 works
17th-century hymns in German
Hymns in The English Hymnal